This is a list of alleged extraterrestrial beings that have been reported in close encounters, claimed or speculated to be associated with "Unidentified flying objects" (UFOs) (not to be confused with the meaning of the term 'alien species' in the biological science of ecology).

List
{| class="wikitable" align="center" width="100%"
|-
| Flatwoods monster
| Tall humanoid with a spade-shaped head.
|-
| Greys
 Also spelled "Grays" (in American English).
 Roswell incident
| Grey-skinned humanoids, usually 1 metre (3–4 feet) tall, hairless, with large heads, black almond-shaped eyes, nostrils without a nose, slits for mouths, no ears and 3–4 fingers including thumb. Greys have been the predominant extraterrestrial beings of alleged alien contact since the 1960s.
|-
| Hopkinsville goblin
| Small, greenish-silver humanoids.
|-
| Little green men
| Diminutive green humanoids. Even though a few abductions have referred to green skin, no report has ever involved anything that would fit the classic cultural stereotype of "Little Green Men". They are included here only for cultural reference.
|-
| Nordic aliens
 Sometimes called Space Brothers
 Plejaren (previously known as Pleiadeans from the Pleiades)
 Venusians
 Tall whites
 Agarthans from Agartha
| Humanoids with stereotypical "Nordic features" (tall, blonde hair, blue eyes) and have featured in several cases of contact. It is said they are from Ancient Earth but presenting themselves as ETs in the past, they moved from living on the surface to live underground around the Himalayas area after a natural event.
|-
| Cryptozoological animals and cryptobotanical plants, including those from folklore, religion (e.g. golem), mythology (e.g. dwarf (see also dwarfism); giants from Atlantis (see also gigantism), etc.), and even some reports of ghosts, poltergeists, and time travellers (alleged)
 Mothman (see also American folklore)
 Jersey Devil
 Loch Ness monster ("Nessie") (dinosauroid)
 African Nommo
 Mokele-mbembe
 Yokai (many varieties) 
 Quinametzin
 Rephaite
| Some claim that many of the allegedly real creatures from the Fortean archives (see also: Fortean Times and William R. Corliss) and related reports of anomalous phenomena are actually of extraterrestrial or mixed origin, such as in the extraterrestrial hypothesis, the interdimensional hypothesis, or the cryptoterrestrial hypothesis. Sometimes these creatures are associated with the occult or with esotericism, or linked with supernatural or paranormal phenomena. Others dismiss these explanations in favor of skepticism, cultural tracking, or the psychosocial hypothesis such as in cases of mass hysteria. Some of these alleged encounters have turned out to be hoaxes or scams to boost local tourism, sell more newspapers or more fringe science books.
|-
|Reptilians and Reptiloids (sometimes spelled as reptillians)
 Ancient astronauts (see ancient astronauts, ancient aliens, ancient astronauts in popular culture, Ancient Aliens)
 Draconians
 Orion reptillian-humanoid matriarchy (see Reptilian conspiracy theory)
 List of reptilian humanoids
 Lizard Man of Scape Ore Swamp
 fictionalized portrayals: They Live, V, Stargate, Star Trek, Worldwar, Gamehendge , etc.
| Tall, scaly humanoids. Reptilian humanoid beings date back at least as far as Ancient Egypt, with the crocodile-headed river god Sobek. The Reptilian conspiracy theory has been advocated by David Icke.
|-
| Rods or Skyfish
| Elongated visual artifacts appearing in photos and video recordings, sometimes claimed to be extraterrestrial beings. Generally thought to be caused by motion blur from flying insects.
|}

See also
 List of humanoid aliens
 :Category:Alleged UFO-related entities
 Alien abduction
 Alien abduction entities
 MUFON (USA) and Kosmopoisk (Russia)
 UFO contactees
 Ancient astronauts
 Conspiracy theory
 List of conspiracy theories
 New World Order
 Extraterrestrial hypothesis
 Cryptoterrestrial hypothesis
 Interdimensional hypothesis
 List of occult terms
 Horizontal evolution
 Genetic mutation
 Chimera
 Evolutionary biology

In fiction
 List of fictional extraterrestrials 
 Template:Fictional biology
 :Category:Lists of fictional alien species
 Lists of fictional species
 List of alien races in Marvel Comics
 List of alien races in DC Comics
 The Twilight Zone Star Trek Star Wars Stargate Babylon 5 Battlestar Galactica Mass Effect''
 Template:Science fiction

References

External links
 Malevolent Alien Abduction Research (MAAR): Alien Species
 UFO Casebook, SEARCH: Alien Races/Species
 Abducted: How People Come to Believe They Were Kidnapped by Aliens (2005)

 
UFO-related lists